326th Tarnopolsky Order of Kutuzov Heavy Bomber Air Division (326 TBAD) is an Aviation Division of the Long Range Aviation of Russia. It was previously part of the 37th Air Army of the Supreme High Command. It was originally formed as the 326th Night Bomber Aviation Division, formed at Yegoryevsk in Moscow Oblast on 10 October 1943. On 23 June 1944, it was renamed the 326th Bomber Aviation Division.

History 
In 1945, it had three regiments of Tupolev Tu-2 bombers. 12th Heavy Bomber Aviation Regiment was briefly part of the division in 1959–60 at Ostrov, Pskov Oblast, while flying Tu-16s.

Components in 1990 according to Michael Holm:
Division Headquarters, Tartu
132nd Heavy Bomber Aviation Regiment (Raadi Airfield, Tartu, Estonian SSSR) with Tu-22M3 and Tu-16K
402nd Heavy Bomber Aviation Regiment (Balbasovo, Vitebsk Oblast) with Tu-22M3 and Tu-16K
840th Heavy Bomber Aviation Regiment (Soltsy-2, Novgorod Oblast) with Tu-22M3

Headquarters were located at:
Raadi Airfield, Estonian SSR, December 1959–1992 [58 24 08N, 26 49 19E]
Soltsy-2, Novgorod Oblast, 1992–1998 [58 08 16N, 30 19 47E]
Ukrainka (air base), Amur Oblast, 1998–2009/2010 [50 32 21N, 79 11 38E]

From 1987 to 1991, Dzhokhar Dudayev, who later became president of the self-proclaimed Chechen Republic of Ichkeria, was the commander of the division.

In 1991, the division was part of the 30th Air Army. In the division were:
 40th Heavy Bomber Aviation Regiment (Tu-95K planes) Ukrainka)
 79th Red Star Order Heavy Bomber Aviation Regiment (planes Tu-95km Tu-95K Ukrainka)

The division's dispersal airfields included Ugolny Airport near Anadyr, Magadan Airport, and Tiksi.

Composition 
The command of the division was at the Ukrainka airbase in the Far East.

The composition of the division included:
 182 Guards Red Berlin-Sevastopol Heavy Bomber Aviation Regiment (Tu-95MS planes) (Ukrainka)
 79th Red Star Order Heavy Bomber Aviation Regiment (Tu-95MS aircraft) (Ukrainka)
 200th Guards Heavy Bomber Aviation Regiment Brest Red (Tu-22M3 planes) (Belaya)
 444th Berlin Order of Kutuzov III, and Alexander Nevsky Heavy Bomber Aviation Regiment (Tu-22M3 aircraft) (Vozdvizhenka (air base))

In 2007–2009, the 444th Heavy Bomber Aviation Regiment was disbanded.

As of 2020, the division was reported based at Ukrainka with one element reportedly operating Tu-22M3 bombers from the Belaya air base as part of Russian Long Range Aviation.

Notes

External links 
 newspaper "The Amur's true." The sky is based on the land

Bomber aviation units and formations of the Soviet Air Forces
Aviation divisions of the Soviet Air Forces
Aviation divisions of the Russian Air Forces
Military units and formations established in 1951
Strategic bombing units and formations of the USSR
1951 establishments in the Soviet Union